Robert Villiers Grimston, 1st Baron Grimston of Westbury, 1st Baronet (8 June 1897 – 8 December 1979) was a British Conservative politician.

Life and history
Grimston was the eldest son of the Rev. and Hon. Robert Grimston, Canon of St Albans, and grandson of James Grimston, 2nd Earl of Verulam. Grimston was educated at Windlesham House School and Repton School, before going on to the City and Guilds Engineering College and the University of London.

During World War I, he was commissioned into the RGA (6th Howitzers) in 1916 and served in Thessaloniki and Palestine from 1916 to 1919.

Grimston was elected as Conservative Member of Parliament (MP) for Westbury, Wiltshire in 1931, holding the seat until 1964. He served as a Junior Lord of the Treasury and Assistant Whip (unpaid) in 1937, Vice-Chamberlain of the Household from 1938 to 1939, Treasurer of the Household from 1939 to 1942. He then held junior ministerial office as Assistant Postmaster-General from 1942 to 1945 and as Parliamentary Secretary to the Ministry of Supply in 1945.

He was later Deputy Chairman of Ways and Means from 1962 to 1964, and was a member of the UK Delegation to the General Assembly of the United Nations in 1960.

Grimston was created a Baronet on 11 March 1952 and was raised to the peerage being created Baron Grimston of Westbury, of Westbury in the County of Wiltshire, on 11 December 1964.

Coat of arms

References

External links
 

Grimston of Westbury, Robert Villiers Grimston, 1st Baron
Grimston of Westbury, Robert Villiers Grimston, 1st Baron
Grimston of Westbury, Robert Villiers Grimston, 1st Baron
British Army personnel of World War I
Grimston, Robert Villiers
Conservative Party (UK) hereditary peers
Robert
Ministers in the Churchill wartime government, 1940–1945
Hereditary barons created by Elizabeth II
Grimston of Westbury, Robert Villiers Grimston, 1st Baron
People educated at Windlesham House School
Grimston of Westbury, Robert Villiers Grimston, 1st Baron
Treasurers of the Household
UK MPs 1931–1935
UK MPs 1935–1945
UK MPs 1945–1950
UK MPs 1950–1951
UK MPs 1951–1955
UK MPs 1955–1959
UK MPs 1959–1964
UK MPs who were granted peerages
Ministers in the Churchill caretaker government, 1945
Ministers in the Chamberlain wartime government, 1939–1940
Ministers in the Chamberlain peacetime government, 1937–1939